Valri Bromfield (born February 10, 1949) is a Canadian comedian, actress, writer, and television producer who started her career as one half of a comedy team with Dan Aykroyd. Together, they joined the first Toronto company of The Second City where she was one of the original players.

Career
She formed a comedy team with Dan Aykroyd. Bromfield was a regular performer on the 1974 The Bobbie Gentry Show. She performed comedy on the first episode of Saturday Night Live on October 11, 1975. Between dress rehearsal and the live airing, Lorne Michaels told her she had to cut her monologue from five minutes to two.

She also appeared on another SNL episode in 1978. In 1979 she played "Mary Mary" on the ABC series Angie.  In 1980, she appeared as the character "Debbie Smith" on The David Letterman Show.  She played "Laney Gibbs" in Best of the West in 1981 and appeared on six episodes of SCTV between 1983 and 1984. In 1984, she appeared on nine episodes of The New Show, another NBC sketch comedy show produced by Saturday Night Live creator Lorne Michaels.

In 1993, she appeared as herself on Friends of Gilda. As the character "Faith Burdette", Bromfield appeared on nineteen episodes of Grace Under Fire between 1993 and 1995. In 1995, she appeared on Joe Bob's Drive-In Theater.

Bromfield appeared on the CBC's 90 Minutes Live and the BCTV show Zig Zag, both in her native Canada.

Film appearances
Her film credits include the role of "Doris" in the 1983 movie Mr. Mom, the role of "Belle Haimes" in the 1987 movie Home Is Where the Hart Is, the role of "Detective Casey" in the 1989 movie Who's Harry Crumb?, the role of "Miss Purdah" in the 1991 movie Nothing but Trouble, the role of "Brandy" in the 1992 movie Caged Fear, the role of Dawny in the 1992 movie This Is My Life, and the role of Wilma Jerzyck in the 1993 movie Needful Things (1993).

Voice acting
As a voice actor, she made her animation debut in the 1974 television movie The Gift of Winter. A Halloween-themed sequel four years later that was titled Witch's Night Out. Bromfield was the voice of "Honey Bunny Funnybunny" on an ABC Weekend Special in 1994 based on the works of Marilyn Sadler. She voiced "Nurse Molly" on Camp Candy and has provided voices for Popples, Animaniacs, Tiny Toon Adventures, Superman: The Animated Series and other animated shows.

Other credits
Bromfield has worked behind the scenes in a creative capacity on numerous TV series. From 1986 to 1990, she was a creative consultant on Head of the Class. During the 1990–91 season, she served as a co-producer on Going Places. She was also a supervising producer on The Kids in the Hall. Bromfield has been credited as a writer on a number of shows in which she has appeared and other television shows such as That Thing (1978) and Space Cases (1996).

Personal life
Her sister Lois Bromfield is also a comedic actor, writer, and producer.  Her brother Rex Bromfield is a writer and retired film director.

References

Works cited

External links

1949 births
20th-century Canadian actresses
Actresses from Toronto
Canadian film actresses
Canadian impressionists (entertainers)
Canadian sketch comedians
Canadian television actresses
Canadian television producers
Canadian women television producers
Canadian voice actresses
Comedians from Toronto
Living people
20th-century Canadian comedians